The list of active ships of the Chilean Navy is a list of the ships that are currently in service in the Chilean Navy. The navy has several naval units that allow it to offer the Chilean State a naval power and an effective maritime service, to safeguard the sovereignty and territorial integrity, maintain the security of the nation and support national interests in any place.

Summary and method
The Chilean Navy currently has 133 active vessels. The following summary of the Chilean ships has been taken from the official website of the navy and also from other references added in the article.

According to the type or specialty of the ship they are:

 4 attack submarines (SSK)
 8 frigates
 3 missile boats 
 94 patrols
 5 transports and amphibious ships (and 3 small support barges)
 2 replenishments (AO)
 2 research vessels (and 2 support research boats)  
 1 Rescue and salvage vessel
 1 Medical-dental patrol vessel
 2 tugboats
 4 ferries
 1 training ship
 1 historical relic (nominal ship)

In the tables, the different ships are grouped according to their class. The tables begin with the class of the ships and name of the ships, followed by its hull classification symbol and pennant number (No.), year of commission (Comm.), displacement, type, builder (indicating the place if possible), and note (ship references). The ship classes (and those without a class) with the largest displacement appear first in the list, sorted by year of commissioning.

In the event that a ship has been previously used by another navy or by a private naval company, the year of original commissioning will also be taken. The spaces in the table where the information is unknown or does not exist will bear the following symbol (—).

Active ships

Submarines

Frigates

Fast attack boats

Patrols

In addition to the naval units in this table, the navy has patrol boats that have no names and are identified only by their pennant number. These are:
 26  patrol boats (Type LPM and LSR) and 16  patrol boats (Type PM) of the  US company SAFE Boats International were acquired between 2006 and 2014, according to the Rhin-Sar project.
 Another 15 Defender class patrol boats were acquired between 2018 and 2020 from the same company, according to the Rhin II Lacustre project.

Transports and amphibious ships

There are also three small support barges that were purchased from France in 2011 together with the LPD. These are the LCU Canave of the CDIC class and the LCM Reyes and Fuentes of the CTM class.

Replenishment vessels

Research vessels

There are also two hydrographic support boats to carry out work in shallow waters. The boat Albatros LH-01, acquired in 2008, and a ''Defender'' class boat, acquired in 2015, and identified by pennant number LH-02.

Rescue vessel

Medical patrol vessel

Fleet tugs

Ferries

Training ship

Historical relic

See also
 List of decommissioned ships of the Chilean Navy
 List of current equipment of the Chilean Air Force
 List of current equipment of the Chilean Army
 List of active Chile military aircraft
 List of current equipment of the Chilean Marine Corps

Footnotes

References

Sources

External links
 Armada de Chile — Unidades Navales (armada.cl) 
 Chilean Navy — Chilean Navy’s Units (armada.cl)

Chilean Navy
List
List
Active
List
Chile